Villa Sora is either:

 An ancient Roman villa in Torre del Greco
 A villa in Frascati, Italy.  It was built at the end of 16th century by Giacomo Boncompagni, duke of Sora, natural son of Pope Gregory XIII. In the central hall there are painted fresco decorations of Cavalier D'Arpino(17th century). Frescoes by Flemish artists are in two lodges, opposite the villa (Cornelius Scut and Timan Craft).

The villa nowadays houses a school of the Salesians.

Sources
Wells Clara Louisa - The Alban Hills, Vol. I: Frascati - 1878 publisher: Barbera, Rome, Italy - OCLC 21996251

External links
Official Villa Sora website

Sora
Buildings and structures in the Metropolitan City of Rome Capital